The General Electric J47 turbojet (GE company designation TG-190) was developed by General Electric from its earlier J35. It first flew in May 1948. The J47 was the first axial-flow turbojet approved for commercial use in the United States. It was used in many types of aircraft, and more than 30,000 were manufactured before production ceased in 1956. It saw continued service in the US military until 1978. Packard built 3,025 of the engines under license.

Design and development

The J47 design used experience from the TG-180/J35 engine which was described by Flight magazine in 1948 as the most widely used American-conceived turbojet.

Overhaul life for the J47 ranged from 15 hours (in 1948) to a theoretical 1,200 hours (625 achievable in practice) in 1956. For example, the J47-GE-23 was rated to run 225 hours time between overhauls. As installed on the F-86F, it experienced one in-flight shutdown every 33,000 hours in 1955 and 1956.

Variants
J47-GE-1(TG-190A)  thrust.
J47-GE-2 (TG-190E)  at 7,950 rpm, powered the North American FJ-2 Fury
J47-GE-3(TG-190A)  thrust.
J47-GE-7(TG-190B)  thrust.
J47-GE-9(TG-190B)  thrust.
J47-GE-11(TG-190C) Powered the Boeing B-47A and B-47B
J47-GE-13(TG-190C)Powered the North American F-86E Sabre & North American B-45C tornado
J47-GE-15 (7E-TG-190C) Powered the North American B-45C tornado
J47-GE-17 (7E-TG-190D)  at 7,950 rpm dry,  at 7,950 rpm wet, powered the North American F-86D Sabre
J47-GE-17B thrust
J47-GE-19(TG-190C) , powered the Convair B-36D & B-36F
J47-GE-23 (7E-TG-190E) , powered the Boeing B-47B and RB-47B
J47-GE-25 thrust dry, ( with water injection), powered the Boeing B-47E and RB-47E
J47-PM-25 (TG-190E) Production by Packard Motor Car Company
J47-ST-25 (TG-190E) Production by Studebaker Corp.
J47-GE-27 (TG-190E)  thrust, powered the North American F-86F Sabre
J47-GE-29 (TG-190E) Similar to -27
J47-GE-33 thrust, powered the F-86F & F-86K

Applications
 
 Boeing B-47 Stratojet
 Boeing KB-50J Superfortress
 Boeing KC-97 Stratofreighter
 Chase XC-123A
 Convair B-36 Peacemaker
 Convair NB-36
 Curtiss XF-87 Blackhawk
 Martin XB-51
 North American B-45 Tornado
 North American F-86 Sabre
 North American F-86D Sabre
 North American FJ-2 Fury
 Republic XF-91 Thunderceptor

Ground-based vehicles that used the engine include:
 Spirit of America
 M-497 Black Beetle jet-powered railcar

Nuclear-powered X39

In the 1950s, interest in the development of nuclear-powered aircraft led GE to experiment with two nuclear-powered gas turbine designs, one based on the J47, and another new and much larger engine called the X211.

The design based on the J47 became the X39 program. This system consisted of two modified J47 engines which, instead of combusting jet fuel, received their heated, compressed air from a heat exchanger that was part of the Heat Transfer Reactor Experiment (HTRE) reactor. The X-39 was successfully operated in conjunction with three different reactors, the HTRE-1, HTRE-2 and HTRE-3. Had the program not been cancelled, these engines would have been used to power the proposed Convair X-6.

Specifications (J47-GE-25)

See also

References
 
 
 
 http://www.flightglobal.com/pdfarchive/view/1956/1956%20-%200590.html

External links

 Globalsecurity.org – J47

J47
1940s turbojet engines